Anna Thompson may refer to:

 Anna Thompson (athlete) (born 1976), Australian runner
 Anna Thompson (netball player) (born 1986), New Zealand netball player

See also
 Anna Thomson (born 1953), American actress
 Anne Thompson (disambiguation)